Tun Lin (born 6 August  1948) is a Burmese politician who currently serves as a House of Nationalities member of parliament for Tanintharyi Region No. 3 constituency. He is a member of National League for Democracy.

Early life
Tun was born on 6 August 1948 in Tanintharyi, Burma (Myanmar). He graduated B.Sc(Mats), M.Sc(Q), B.Ed.

Political career
Tun was elected as an Amyotha Hluttaw MP, winning a majority of 34,266 votes, from Tanintharyi Region № 3 parliamentary constituency.

References

National League for Democracy politicians
1948 births
Living people